Margie, also known as the American Journal of Poetry, is an annual literary journal, based in Chesterfield, Missouri that features the work of the nation's leading poets. The journal was established in 2000 and is dedicated to the memory of Marjorie J. Wilson (1955-1977). The founder and editor-in-chief is Robert Nazarene. The journal sponsors several prestigious contests, including the annual Robert E. Wilson & Ruth I. Wilson Best Poetry Book Contest. 
 
Among the notable writers whose work has appeared in Margie are Sherman Alexie, Jacob M. Appel, Julianna Baggott, Kate Braverman, W. S. Di Piero, Alice Friman, Michael Harper, Terry Hertzler, Tony Hoagland, Allison Joseph, Ron Offen, Mark Rudman, Enid Shomer, David Wagoner, Laura Madeline Wiseman and R. Scott Yarbrough.

See also
List of literary magazines

References

External links
Official website

Annual magazines published in the United States
Magazines established in 2000
Magazines published in St. Louis
Poetry magazines published in the United States
2000 establishments in Missouri